The 1946 Segunda División Peruana, the second division of Peruvian football (soccer), was played by 8 teams. The tournament winner, Ciclista Lima was promoted to the Primera División Peruana 1947.

Results

Standings

Relegation playoff

External links
 La Historia de la Segunda 1946

 

Peruvian Segunda División seasons
Peru2
2